The Italian Job is a 1969 British comedy caper film, written by Troy Kennedy Martin, produced by Michael Deeley, directed by Peter Collinson, and starring Michael Caine. The film's plot centres around Cockney criminal Charlie Croker, recently released from prison, who forms a gang for the job of stealing a cache of gold bullion being transported through the city of Turin, Italy in an armoured security truck. In addition to Caine, the film's cast also included Benny Hill, Raf Vallone, Tony Beckley, and Noël Coward; the film was Coward's last before his retirement from acting. The soundtrack was composed by Quincy Jones, featuring the songs "On Days Like These", sung by Matt Monro over the opening credits, and "Getta Bloomin' Move On" (usually referred to as "The Self-Preservation Society", after its chorus) during the climactic car chase, which featured Caine among its singers.

The film proved a success upon its release, earning critical acclaim amongst critics for the performances by Caine and Coward, the film's reflection of British culture from the period, and the film's climactic car chase. The Italian Job became a cult symbol of British filmography and was ranked favourably in the top 100 British films by the British Film Institute. Several elements from the film became symbolic cult features, including the film's cliffhanger ending, and Caine's infamous line from the film.

The popularity of The Italian Job led to several parodies and allusions in other films and productions, including the 2005 episode of The Simpsons titled "The Italian Bob", and a re-enactment of the Mini Cooper car-chase in the MacGyver episode "Thief of Budapest". The film itself was later given a video game adaptation in 2001, before receiving a remake in 2003. Marking the 50th anniversary of the film in June 2019, stunt drivers in red, white and blue Coopers recreated parts of the film's car-chase around Turin at the grounds of Mini's Oxford factory.

Plot

Driving through the Alps, British thief Roger Beckermann is killed when his car crashes into a bulldozer parked in a tunnel by the Mafia, who dispose of him and his car by pushing it into a nearby river. Meanwhile, his friend and fellow thief Charlie Croker is released from prison, reuniting with his girlfriend Lorna to enjoy his first taste of freedom. Leaving her to meet with Beckermann for a job he was planning in Italy, Croker is shocked to meet his widow instead. She insists he continue her late husband's plan, which he had completed before his death, of an ambitious heist of $4 million in gold bullion from a security convoy intended as a down payment to Fiat by China for a car factory.

Croker breaks back into prison to ask crime lord Mr. Bridger for financial backing. Initially unconvinced, Bridger soon offers support when he learns of the heist's target. With help from Bridger's organisation, run by his right-hand man Camp Freddie, Croker recruits a crew of specialists, including Lorna and computer expert Professor Peach – the latter for sabotaging Turin's traffic control system. After finalising preparations, Croker and his team are summoned by Bridger to a fake funeral ceremony, where he informs them that the Mafia killed Beckermann because of his planned heist, advising them to be careful, but not to return without the gold.

After leaving for Italy, Croker and some of his crew split off from the others while en route to Turin, to avoid raising suspicion. However, the small group soon encounter the Mafia waiting for them in the Alps, led by their boss Altabani, who destroys their cars. Croker narrowly manages to talk his way out of getting executed. His crew infiltrate the Turin traffic control centre later that night, whereupon Peach replaces one of the computer's magnetic tape data storage reels with a duplicate designed to sabotage Turin's traffic control system on the day of the heist. The next day, as the gold arrives and the crew prepare for the heist, Croker sends Lorna to Geneva to protect her and the plan. At the same time, Peach absconds from the crew, and is later arrested for molesting a woman on a tram.

With the city's closed circuit television traffic monitoring cameras sabotaged and the Turin traffic control system malfunctioning, a massive traffic jam builds up. The crew swiftly ambush the gold convoy outside the Museo Egizio as it is stalled by the traffic jam. Subduing the police and moving the van inside the building, they divide the gold between the boots of three Mini Coopers. Most of the crew then escape the building disguised as football fans, while Croker leads the rest out of the city in the Minis, going through stairs, pedestrian streets, rooftops etc... Following a set route designed by Beckermann, the crew escape from Turin with the gold, and rendezvous with a modified coach to collect the Minis before they reach the Alps. Once aboard, the group unload the gold, dispose of the Minis in the Alps, and collect the rest of the crew.

As Bridger celebrates with his fellow prisoners and prison staff, the coach suddenly loses control and teeters over a cliff, with the gold balancing over the edge. Croker soon contemplates how to save the crew and the gold, which is sliding further away down the vehicle, and claims "hang on a minute lads, I've got a great idea" as the film concludes on a literal cliffhanger.

Cast

Production

Ending
According to a "Making Of" documentary, producer Deeley was unsatisfied with the four written endings and conceived the current ending as a literal cliffhanger appropriate to an action film which left an opportunity for a sequel. The documentary describes how helicopters would save the bus seen on the cliff at the end of the first film. In interviews in 2003 and 2008, Michael Caine revealed that the ending would have had Croker "crawl up, switch on the engine and stay there for four hours until all the petrol runs out... The van bounces back up so we can all get out, but then the gold goes over."

In 2008, the Royal Society of Chemistry held a competition for a solution that had a basis in science, was to take not more than 30 minutes and did not use a helicopter. The idea was to promote greater understanding of science, and to highlight the 100th anniversary of the periodic table, on which gold is one of the 118 elements. The winning entry, by John Godwin of Surrey, was to break and remove two large side windows just aft of the pivot point and let the glass fall outside to lose its weight; break two windows over the two front axles, keeping the broken glass on board to keep its weight for balance; let a man out on a rope through the front broken windows (not to rest his weight on the ground) who deflates all the bus's front tyres, to reduce the bus's rocking movement about its pivot point; drain the fuel tank, which is aft of the pivot point, which changes the balance enough to let a man get out and gather heavy rocks to load the front of the bus. Unload the bus. Wait until a suitable vehicle passes on the road, hijack it, and carry the gold away in it.

Locations

The interior of the prison that held Bridger was Kilmainham Gaol in Dublin, Ireland. The exterior, seen when Croker leaves, is HM Prison Wormwood Scrubs in west London. Upon his release, Croker stays at the Royal Lancaster Hotel in Bayswater, London. Denbigh Close, Notting Hill, W11, was used as the location for Croker's home.

The training sessions shown for the Mini drivers were at the Crystal Palace race track in Upper Norwood, South London. The attempt to blow off the doors of the bullion van, which caused its total destruction and produced Croker's line "You're only supposed to blow the bloody doors off!", took place at Crystal Palace Sports Centre. The Crystal Palace transmitter can be seen in the background. The meeting at the misty funeral was filmed in Cruagh Cemetery, in the foothills of the Dublin Mountains. The office block that doubled as the Turin traffic control centre was Apex House in Hanworth, Middlesex the then head office of the television rental chain Thorn (DER).

The chase sequences were filmed in Turin, except for the chase through the sewer tunnel, which was shot in the Sowe Valley Sewer Duplication system in the Stoke Aldermoor district of Coventry in the English Midlands, filmed from the back of a Mini Moke. The person on the far side who closes the gate at the end of sewer tunnel is the director, Peter Collinson. Collinson also appeared in the scene on the highway when the ramps get jettisoned, clinging to the right-hand rear door of the coach as the Minis enter at speed.

A portion of the car chase was filmed as a dance between the Minis and police cars with a full orchestra playing "The Blue Danube" inside Pier Luigi Nervi's Palazzo Esposizioni, usually used for the Turin Motor Show (and now a hospital library).

The final escape from Turin was filmed on the road from Ceresole Reale via Lago Agnel to Nivolet Pass (the highway does not lead to France or Switzerland because it is a dead end).

Vehicles

Roger Beckermann's orange Lamborghini Miura in the opening scene is actually two cars. The first was a Miura P400 that was sold as new afterwards. In 2015, it was located and authenticated by classic car expert Iain Tyrrell. The second car, tumbled down the chasm by the Mafia bulldozer, was another Miura that had previously been in a serious accident and was not roadworthy. Lamborghini confirmed in May 2019 that the Italian Job Miura had chassis number 3586.

Since a 1968 Mini only weighs , each of these vehicles would have had to carry  times its own weight in gold.

The original DB4 belongs today to a private English collection. According to several sources, the "Aston" pushed off the cliff was a Vignale Lancia Flaminia mocked up as an Aston. The two E-type Jaguars that suffered from the Mafia's revenge were restored to original condition.

A Land Rover Series IIa Estate, registration BKO 686C, was used to get to the convoy before attacking and was modified with window bars and a towbar. A Ford Thames 400E was used for the football fans' decorated van; this was referred to as the Dormobile, the name of a common camper-van conversion coachbuilder. The cross-Channel ferry featured in one scene is the MS Free Enterprise I. The ship spent many years as a day cruise ship in Greek waters before being scrapped in 2013. The "Chinese" plane delivering the gold to Turin is a rare Douglas C-74 Globemaster, of which only 14 were built and only four passed into private ownership. It had been abandoned in Milan by its owners and was moved to Turin for filming. It was destroyed by fire in 1970.

The black Fiat Dino coupé of Mafia boss Altabani was bought by Peter Collinson but became so rusty that only its doors remain.

The bus used to transport the three Mini Coopers was a Bedford VAL with Harrington Legionnaire bodywork, registration ALR 453B, new in April 1964 and specially converted for the film.

Music

The music for the soundtrack was written by Quincy Jones. The opening theme, "On Days Like These", had lyrics by Don Black and was sung by Matt Monro. The closing theme, "Get a Bloomin' Move On" ( "The Self Preservation Society"), was performed by the cast and had lyrics featuring Cockney Rhyming Slang. Many incidental themes are based on British patriotic songs, such as "Rule, Britannia!", "The British Grenadiers" and "God Save the Queen".

Release
The film opened at the Plaza Cinema in London on 5 June 1969.

Reception

On review aggregator Rotten Tomatoes, the film holds an approval rating of 81% and an average rating of 7.4/10, based on 31 reviews. The website's critical consensus reads, "The Italian Job is a wildly fun romp that epitomizes the height of Britannia style." On Metacritic it has a score of 70% based on reviews from 10 critics, indicating "generally favorable reviews. Most positive reviews focus on the climactic car chase and the acting of both Michael Caine and Noël Coward, complementing Peter Collinson's directing. It is considered highly evocative of 1960s London and the era in Britain as a whole. In a modern review Nik Higgins of Future Movies claims that the film makes Austin Powers's wardrobe appear "drab and grey". He compliments Michael Caine's ability to effectively portray the character of Charlie.

In 1999, it was ranked No. 36 on the BFI Top 100 British films by the British Film Institute. In November 2004, Total Film named The Italian Job the 27th greatest British film of all time. In 2011, it was voted the best British film in a poll of film fans conducted by Sky Movies HD. The line "You're only supposed to blow the bloody doors off!" by Caine was voted favourite film one-liner in a 2003 poll of 1,000 film fans. One of the most discussed end scenes in film, what happened to the coachload of gold teetering over the edge of a cliff, has been debated in the decades since the film was released.

Vincent Canby, writing at the time of the film's release, felt that the caper film had been made before and much better as well. He complimented the film's technological sophistication, only criticising what he saw as an "emotionally retarded" plot. Canby also expressed concern that Coward's appearance in the film, although intended to be kind, "exploits him in vaguely unpleasant ways" by surrounding his character with images of the royal family, which had not knighted him at the time. A contemporary review in Time magazine felt that the film spent too much time focusing on the film's caper as opposed to building the characters; it also criticised the car chases as "dull and deafening".

The movie was the 14th most popular at the UK box office in 1969. Although it received a Golden Globe nomination for "Best English-Language Foreign Film", the film was not a success in the US. The film remains popular, however. James Travers of Films de France believes that the film's enduring appeal rests in the "improbable union" of Michael Caine, Noël Coward and Benny Hill, whom he considers "three of the best known [British] performers[...] in the late 1960s". He states that the film has a cult status and stands as a "classic of its genre".

Legacy
Since 2000, there have been two remakes of the film. The first was released in 2003 and also called The Italian Job, set in Los Angeles and starring Mark Wahlberg as Charlie Croker. It features Donald Sutherland as John Bridger, played as more of a father figure to Croker. It employs the updated Mini Cooper for a chase towards the end. An official Bollywood remake of the 2003 film, called Players, was released in 2012.

There is a video game based on the 1969 film, released for the PlayStation game console in 2001 and Microsoft Windows in 2002 and published by Rockstar Games. The film was also the subject of a play, Bill Shakespeare's "The Italian Job", written by Malachi Bogdanov, who used lines from Shakespeare plays to tell the story. It was performed in 2003 at the Edinburgh Fringe Festival.

Michael Caine's performance and "bloody doors" line have been parodied in several British comedies, and in a music video for "Pick a Part That's New" by Stereophonics. Large portions of the car chase scenes were lifted directly from the film for use in the MacGyver episode "Thief of Budapest" (Series 1, Ep 3), with the main characters setting up the story with three Minis visible at the start of the episode. Most of the end of the episode is footage from The Italian Job.

As part of a celebration of British culture at 2012 Summer Olympics, which were held in London, a replica of the bus was made and was exhibited balanced on the edge of the roof of The De La Warr Pavilion in Bexhill-on-Sea. The dialogue and car blowing up scene were shown at the closing ceremony.

In September 2016, NBC and Paramount Television began work on a TV series inspired by the original and the remake, though this never surpassed the development stage. In 2001, author Matthew Field released a book The Making of The Italian Job, and to celebrate 50 years since the film's release he has published a new and updated version, The Self Preservation Society.

In February 2021, it was announced that a sequel TV series would be released on Paramount+. It is set to revolve around Croker's grandchildren, who inherit his old safety deposit box, and a quest to find the Italian bullion is reignited. Matt Wheeler will write and executive produce the series, while Donald De Line will produce, after previously doing so for the 2003 remake.

References

External links

 
 
 
 Welcome to TheItalianJob.com
 Film Locations used in The Italian Job
 The Italian Job (charity event) website

1969 films
1960s chase films
1960s crime comedy films
1960s heist films
British chase films
British crime comedy films
British heist films
Films scored by Quincy Jones
Films about automobiles
Films directed by Peter Collinson
Films set in England
Films set in Italy
Films set in London
Films set in Turin
Films shot in England
Films shot in Ireland
Films shot in Italy
Films shot in Kent
Films shot in London
Paramount Pictures films
1969 comedy films
Films with screenplays by Troy Kennedy Martin
1960s English-language films
1960s British films